Euro-Mediterranean Human Rights Monitor (commonly known as Euro-Med Monitor and sometimes as Euro-Med HRM) is an independent, nonprofit organization for the protection of human rights. Its main objective is to raise awareness about human rights law in the area and to influence the international community to take action against human rights violators.

Richard Falk, the former United Nations Special Rapporteur on the situation of human rights in the Palestinian territories occupied since 1967, serves as the chairman of the Board of Trustees of the Euro-Mediterranean Human Rights Monitor.

In a speech before the United Nations Human Rights Council on October 1, 2020, Euro-Med Monitor complained about an Israeli campaign aimed at impeding the work of human rights organizations in the Palestinian territories. The speech said that the campaign included preventing Amnesty International’s officer Laith Abu Ziyad from accompanying his mother to East Jerusalem to attend her chemotherapy sessions; the deportation of Omar Shakir, Director of Human Rights Watch (HRW) in the occupied Palestinian territories; and the continued harassment of Euro-Med Monitor’s chairman, Ramy Abdu, and staff.

As of May 21, 2021, the United Nations Committee on Non-Governmental Organizations postponed action on the group's application for consultative status, "as the representative of Libya requested details about the outcome of its research into human rights violations in his country and how it managed to deploy 60 researchers without the recognition of local authorities." On September 2, 2021, the committee postponed the action again, "as the representative of Bahrain asked about the contractual relationship with another group and funding." The action faced yet another postponement in September 2021, "as the representative of Israel asked for details on its relationship with two main funding entities". On 1 September 2022, the committee postponed consideration because "the representative of Bahrain asked for a list of workshops and training programmes it organized in 2020 and 2021 including dates, locations, partners and sponsors".

Foundation 
Euro-Mediterranean Human Right Monitor was founded by Ramy Abdu in November 2011 in Geneva, where it maintains its headquarters, facilitating access to European institutions of governance and law—its primary targets and audience.

Management 
Euro-Med Monitor's strategic direction is guided by its Board of Trustees, which includes human rights professionals including professors, academics, lawyers, advisors and international activists. Richard A. Falk is the chairman of the board of trustees. Members are: Christine Chinkin, Noura Erakat, Celso Amorim, Lisa Hajjar, Tareq Ismael, John V. Whitbeck and Tanya Cariina Newbury-Smith.

In 2020, Maha Hussaini, Euro-Med Monitor's Strategy Director won the Martin Adler Prize, awarded by the prestigious Rory Peck Trust, for reporting for Middle East Eye from Gaza.

Work
Women's Leadership Incubator (2017-2019) project was funded by the Swedish Kvinna Till Kvinna organization and aimed to empower women in the Gaza Strip to defend their rights and create their own sources of income. The project was based on funding and training local non-governmental organizations staff through capacity-building programs to support women and enhance their social and economic participation.

Euro-Med Monitor launched an innovative project to provide training and mentorship to young Palestinians who are ambitious about serving in different jobs available in the field of human rights. The project adopted the training-mentorship-production (TMP) model, where participants first receive training, then get linked with experts serving as their mentors, and finally are encouraged to utilize their skills and connections to contribute to the advancement of human rights in different ways while continuing to receive expert advice and close mentorship aiding their professional development.

In cooperation with the University of Jordan, Euro-Med Monitor carried out the Summer Human Rights Program, focusing on human rights during armed conflict. The project targeted students from seven Arab countries, including Yemen, Libya and Syria. The purpose of the program was to spread peace and human rights culture and promote adherence to international standards agreed upon in international law during armed conflicts

The WikiRights project aimed to train university students and recent graduates in conflict zones to improve the human rights content on Wikipedia. Euro-Med Monitor offered free workshops to train students on several techniques to modify Wikipedia articles in both Arabic and English

Watering the seeds was a project launched by Euro-Med Monitor in 2017. It aimed to support budding youth groups who fight for human rights and freedoms in war-torn countries. The support includes material and logistical support, consultations, organizing training courses. The targeted organizations have managed to accomplish wide-scale of human rights achievements that varied from documenting violations, implementing initiatives, launching campaigns and projects to support marginalized groups, victims of violations, and vulnerable communities.

We Are Not Numbers is a storytelling project launched in February 2015. It brings young writers from Gaza, who write in English, and provides them with workshops on writing stories and articles, social media, and how to approach a western audience. The project has received coverage by international media. Participants receive six months of training that connects Palestinians with native speakers and English language specialists as mentors. On March 31, 2022, We Are Not Numbers celebrated the graduation of 54 Palestinian writers.

In September 2022, Farah Maraqa, one of seven Arab employees of Deutsche Welle fired in February, subsequently sued DW and won her case. The court ruled that her dismissal on charges of anti-Semitism was "legally unjustified". Euro-Med Monitor carried out an investigation finding Maraqa’s articles in question had been taken out of context and that a Deutsche Welle commissioned inquiry contained "several instances of embracing a pro-Israeli narrative against Palestinians."

Publications 
Euro-Med Monitor regularly publishes reports on many different topics relating to the human rights situation in Europe and MENA, including,

Migrants and Refugees 
In September 2021, Euro-Med Monitor and ImpACT International documented widespread state-sponsored violations of human rights against African migrant workers in the UAE. The two organizations released a report based on about 100 interviews with migrant workers from African countries who confirmed that the authorities carried out a massive campaign of arrests against about 800 African workers in the country.

In January 2021, Euro-Med Monitor released a report indicating that the Frontex was involved in illegal pushbacks of migrants and asylum seekers in the Mediterranean.

In December 2020, Euro-Med Monitor released a study in cooperation with the York University to address the risks that refugees with disabilities in Turkey face, including lack of adequate care and social services.

In December 2017, Euro-Med Monitor and Amsterdam International Law Clinic issued a report on the legal position of ‘Stateless Persons’ in the EU, shedding light on the EU's laws concerning stateless persons.

In September 2014, Euro-Med Monitor revealed information about the fate of hundreds of migrants after their ship wrecked in the Mediterranean,

Arbitrary Detention 
In April 2021, a group of 22 influential academics signed a Euro-Med Monitor petition demanding the government of Saudi Arabia to release former minister Abdulaziz Al-Dakhil.

In July 2020, Euro-Med Monitor released a report on Jordanian government measures against teachers, including arresting teachers’ syndicate leaders and shutting down the syndicate.

In March, 2021, the group sent a letter to UK authorities signed by 15 UK MPs and peers to highlight the case of Michael Smith who is detained in Dubai. The Independent quoted Dr. Tanya Newbury-Smith, a Euro-Mediterranean Human Rights Monitor trustee, as saying: "There has been strong backlash against Dubai over its detention and treatment of Princess Latifa, and her case is one of many."

Treatment of Civilians During Armed Conflict 
On May 24, 2022, Euro-Med Human Rights Monitor and UN Women Palestine organized an art exhibition, titled "I am 22, I lost 22 people," showing paintings made by a survivor of an Israeli airstrike on Gaza during the Israeli military attack on the Strip in May 2021. The survivor, Zainab Al-Qolaq, displayed the suffering she had experienced from the moment her house was bombed and her 12-hour stay under the rubble until she found out that she had lost 22 members of her family, in addition to the internal struggles she has been facing since that time.

Euro-Med Monitor and UN Women Palestine released a booklet that gathered al-Qolaq's paintings and texts describing the psychological impact of the incident and presenting information about the targeting of the al-Qolaq family house.

References

External links

Human rights organisations based in Switzerland
Organizations established in 2011
Organisations based in Geneva
Human rights organizations